Yokahu Lodge 506 is the Order of the Arrow Lodge of the Puerto Rico Council of the Boy Scouts of America. As of December 2021, Yokahu Lodge is part of the new Eastern Region, Section E17 (formerly Northeastern Region, Section NE-5) of the Order of the Arrow. The Lodge's totem is the Three-Point Taíno Cemí.

History
In 1953, the very first delegation of Scouts from the Puerto Rico Council attended the National Scout Jamboree at Irving Ranch, California. Among the activities, the delegation witnessed in awe an Order of the Arrow ceremony that caught the attention of its adults. Having the ceremony concluded, they approached the OA members and asked them about the ceremony and its meanings. Upon the delegation's return to Puerto Rico, the idea of the Order of the Arrow was taken to the Puerto Rico Council.

With the necessary requirements in hand provided by the OA National Office, the council commended the founding of the Order of the Arrow in Puerto Rico to its executive Luis Matías Ferrer in 1954. Having no knowledge of the organization, he sought the help of Dr. Frank H. Wadsworth, who had been inducted in the Order of the Arrow during his youth in the United States, and was also the only OA member in Puerto Rico at the time. The first Ordeal ceremony took place April 10–15, 1954 at Guajataka Scout Reservation with Dr. Wadsworth acting as the first Ordealmaster. Because of this role in the first Ordeal ceremony, Wadsworth has been recognized as the Yokahu Lodge's main, or sometimes only, founder throughout its history with not enough credit given to Luis Matías Ferrer.

After the establishment of the Order of the Arrow in Puerto Rico, the Lodge was named Yukiyú later renamed to Yokahu, a variant of the name proposed by archaeologist, anthropologist and historian, Dr. Ricardo Alegría. In the beginning, the Lodge translated the ceremony scripts from English to Spanish and used Native American regalia, but decided later to slightly modify the ceremonies by assimilating the Taíno heritage with the Lenni Lennape culture, incorporating Taíno-based regalia and adapting the scripts to the Taíno culture. Yokahu Lodge is the only Order of the Arrow Lodge that uses Spanish as its main language.

When Yokahu Lodge was founded, it also covered the United States Virgin Islands when the Puerto Rico Council was then-known as the "Puerto Rico and Virgin Islands Council". A chapter for the Virgin Islands, Chapter Arawak, was created to support them until they separated and created the Virgin Islands Council and Arawak Lodge 562 in 1965.

Headquarters
The Lodge's office headquarters, where lodge, section and national business are managed, are within the Puerto Rico Council while field headquarters are at Guajataka Scout Reservation, considered as the official home of Yokahu Lodge. Most of the Lodge activities are celebrated in the camp where the Order of the Arrow has provided service to the facilities for many years. The OA has its own campsite, called "The Cabin", which occupancy has been discontinued due to structural damages, but still remains standing. In the past, the Paquito Joglar campsite area was considered the official gathering place for the Lodge, later becoming a campers area due to the need of space for the many Scouts that attended camp.

Chapters
Throughout its history, Yokahu Lodge 506 has been composed of varying numbers of chapters. More or fewer chapters were created or merged with others to adapt to changes in their membership and in the national and local regulations of the BSA and the Order of the Arrow. As many as nine chapters have existed at different times in their history. Since 2018, there are six active chapters aligned with the same number and territory of districts of the Puerto Rico Council.

The name of each chapter corresponds to words or names from the Taíno language. Arasibo, Guarionex and Majagua are named after caciques who ruled the territory where each chapter is located in. Cayniabón, Guaraka and Yagüeka are named after the Taíno name of each of their chapter's territories. Guaní and Guaitiao mean "golden disk that identifies the Cacique" and "friendship", respectively. Finally, the former Arawak Chapter took its name from the Arawak people of which the Taínos formed an important part.

The current chapters and the cities belonging to each one (with base cities denoted in bold) are:

Arasibo: Arecibo, Barceloneta, Camuy, Ciales, Florida, Hatillo, Lares, Manatí, Morovis, Orocovis, Quebradillas, Utuado, Vega Baja

Guaitiao: Canóvanas, Carolina, Fajardo, Guaynabo, Loíza, Luquillo, Río Grande, San Juan, Trujillo Alto

Guaní: Aguas Buenas, Aibonito, Caguas, Cayey, Ceiba, Cidra, Comerío, Culebra, Gurabo, Humacao, Juncos, Las Piedras, Maunabo, Naguabo, Patillas, San Lorenzo, Vieques, Yabucoa

Guarionex: Adjuntas, Arroyo, Coamo, Guayama, Guayanilla, Jayuya, Peñuelas, Ponce, Salinas, Santa Isabel, Villalba, Yauco

Majagua: Barranquitas, Bayamón, Cataño, Corozal, Dorado, Naranjito, Toa Alta, Toa Baja, Vega Alta

Yagüeka: Aguada, Aguadilla, Añasco, Cabo Rojo, Guánica, Hormigueros, Isabela, Lajas, Las Marías, Maricao, Mayagüez, Moca, Rincón, Sabana Grande, San Germán, San Sebastián

Lodge Chiefs

Activities

Main
There are four main activities in the Lodge's calendar. The Retorno is celebrated on a weekend between March and April; its purpose is to reunite the Lodge's Arrowmen to lay out and distribute the year's activities and the chapters in charge of running each one, it also serves as a chance to meet the new Lodge Executive Board for the year. Halfway through the year, the Lodge celebrates its high adventure activity between August and September, in order to challenge each Arrowmen's outdoor skills. In October, the Lodge celebrates its Guateke (from the Taíno language, meaning gathering), a fellowship event in which chapters participate in various competitions such as ceremony, regalia, dialogue, sports, triathlon and trivia; the highlight of the Guateke is the youth nominations for the positions of the Lodge Executive Board during the Fall Assembly. Finally in December, the annual Convention serves as the conclusion of the Lodge's year, similar to a "Court of Honor", in which different recognitions and awards are handed out based on service during the year and the youth elections for the executive board are held.

Other activities include the start-of-the-year Lodge Leadership Seminar followed by the First Executive Meeting, both taking place the same day early January, the Second Executive Meeting between March and April, the third and final Executive Meeting between late August and early September and a service project.

Inductions
Inductions are celebrated four times a year, usually once a month from May to August. The induction weekends are called Ordeal/Bros, which began in 1993, since both Ordeal and Brotherhood ceremonies take place at the same time. The Vigil Honor is celebrated as an independent activity from Saturday evening to midday Sunday on the weekend of Thanksgiving, strictly open to Vigil Honor members and candidates.

2008 Section Conclave
The 2008 NE-2A Section Conclave took place at Guajataka Scout Reservation, marking the first time that the Yokahu Lodge hosted such event and the first to be held outside the United States. The event had a record attendance of 500 Arrowmen including the National Chief and Vice-Chief, Northeast Region Chief and many Section Chiefs. In this Conclave, the Section changed from NE-2A to NE-5A with the Section losing and acquiring other Lodges. At this event, Alberto del Valle, from Yokahu Lodge, became the second Puerto Rican to become a Section officer after being elected Section Vice-Chief. The first Yokahu Arrowman to become a Section officer was Fernando Moreno, who was elected Section Secretary, years prior.

2016 Section Conclave
Yokahu hosted the NE-5A Section Conclave in August 2016 at Guajataka Scout Reservation for the second time in its Lodge history. More than 350 people from New Jersey and Puerto Rico attended the event, including the Order of the Arrow's National Chief, Northeast Region Chief and NE-5B Section Chief (also, NE-5 Section Co-Chief). In this Conclave, the outgoing Section Chief, Rodrigo Córdova, from Yokahu Lodge, who became the third Puerto Rican to become a Section officer, passed on his position to Christian Wolpert Gaztambide, another fellow Yokahu Arrowman, who was also elected as Section Chief of NE-5A and, subsequently, NE-5 Section Co-Chief. He became the fourth Puerto Rican to become a Section officer, the second to become Section Chief and the first back-to-back for the same position for a Yokahu Arrowman. This Conclave marked the final one as Section NE-5A before its merger with NE-5B to form one NE-5, acquiring an additional six Lodges to the five that NE-5A already had.

National Leadership Seminar
In 2002, Yokahu Lodge hosted the order's National Leadership Seminar for the first time which included visits from the National Chief and Northeast Region Chief. Yokahu again hosted the NLS for their membership's attendance in October 2014 and included visits from the Northeast Region Chief and the National Vice-Chief.

Awards
The Lodge has its own recognitions for distinguished service to the Lodge. The Cemí de Bronce is awarded to youth, while the Premio del Alegre Servicio, also known as the Three W's, which consists of three pins with the letter W on each one, is awarded to adults. Like the Vigil Honor, these awards are not earned by a set of requirements, but instead are awarded on a specific criteria set by a recognitions committee composed of youth Arrowmen. These awards have their own quota and are given during the convention.

Yokahu Lodge co-founder Dr. Frank H. Wadsworth is the Lodge's only recipient of the Distinguished Service Award, awarded in 1965 in recognition of his service to the Order of the Arrow. The Lodge was recipient of the Journey To Excellence Gold Award for the first time in 2013.

Media
Yokahu Lodge publishes a newsletter named El Cemí, established by a young Alfred D. Herger shortly after the foundation of the Lodge. It is named after the Lodge totem and is traditionally published four times a year on March, September, October and December. In January 2012, the Lodge launched their official Facebook and Twitter accounts, integrating the era of social media to their communications and establishing efficient interactions with their Arrowmen. In January 2013, the Lodge created their Instagram account and, later, Snapchat in August 2015. The publication, social platforms and email are all managed between the chairman of the communications committee and the Lodge secretary, with assistance from the adult advisers.

See also
Order of the Arrow
Scouting in Puerto Rico

Notes

References

External links
Yokahu Lodge Facebook
Yokahu Lodge Twitter
Yokahu Lodge Instagram
Puerto Rico Council Facebook

Order of the Arrow lodges